Liu Binbin (born 16 June 1993) is a Chinese professional footballer who currently plays for Chinese Super League club Shandong Taishan as a right-footed left winger.

Club career
Liu Binbin started his football career when he joined Shandong Luneng's (now known as Shandong Taishan) youth academy in 2005 and was described as a potentially hot prospect for the future. He was loaned out to Ligue 2 club FC Metz along with Xie Pengfei for youth training in 2010. During the 2011 season, Liu returned to Shandong and was then sent out to China League Two side Shandong Youth. He scored his first goal for Shandong Youth on 3 July 2011 in a 4-0 win against Qinghai Youth. Liu was then promoted to the club's first team by Henk ten Cate during the 2012 season. He made his debut for the club on 10 March 2012 in a 2-1 loss against Guizhou Renhe.

The following season he would score his first goal for the club on 17 August 2013, in a league game against Liaoning Whowin in a 2-1 victory. He would go on to establish himself a vital member in the teams and would aid the club by winning the 2014 Chinese FA Cup with them. A consistent regular within the team, he would gain his second Chinese FA Cup by winning the 2020 Chinese FA Cup against Jiangsu Suning F.C. in a 2-0 victory. This would be followed by his first league title with the club when he was part of the team that won the 2021 Chinese Super League title. Another Chinese FA Cup would be followed up by him winning the 2022 Chinese FA Cup with them.

International career
Liu was first called up to the Chinese under-20 national team by Su Maozhen in June 2010 and played for the under-20 national team at the 2010 AFC U-19 Championship. He continued to be called up to the under-20 side by Jan Olde Riekerink who took charge the team in 2011 and played in the 2011 Toulon Tournament. Liu scored one goal in three appearances during 2012 AFC U-19 Championship qualification as his team qualified for the 2012 AFC U-19 Championship. Liu made his debut for the Chinese national team on 13 December 2014 in a 4-0 win against Kyrgyzstan; however, the match was not recognised as an international "A" match by FIFA. He made his official debut on 21 December 2014 in a 0-0 draw against Palestine.

Career statistics

Club statistics
.

International statistics

Scores and results list China's goal tally first.

Honours

Club
Shandong Luneng/ Shandong Taishan
Chinese Super League: 2021.
Chinese FA Cup: 2014, 2020, 2021, 2022.
Chinese FA Super Cup: 2015.

Individual
Chinese Football Association Young Player of the Year: 2014

References

External links
 
 
Player profile at sodasoccer.com

1993 births
Living people
People from Meixian District
Hakka people
Chinese footballers
China international footballers
Shandong Taishan F.C. players
Association football midfielders
Hakka sportspeople
2015 AFC Asian Cup players
Chinese Super League players
China League Two players
Footballers from Meizhou